The Catholic Church in Estonia is the national branch of the worldwide Catholic Church, under the spiritual leadership of the Pope in Rome.

History of Catholicism in Estonia
At the beginning of the 13th century, Estonia was conquered by the German Teutonic Order during the Livonian Crusade and thus was one of the last territories in Europe to be Christianized. However, some archaeological evidence suggests that Christianity was already known centuries prior to the conquest. Based on archaeological relics, such as crosses and metal book corners, some areas of Estonia were Christian prior to the 13th century.

The whole of Estonia was subjugated by the year 1227 and, until the mid 16th century, Estonia was divided among feudal landlords and, thus, Catholic territory, although not yet unified.

During the Livonian War, medieval Estonia was conquered by the Swedes, initially occupying northern Estonia and, later, the southern part. Swedish rule, from 1561–1710, banned Catholicism for the benefit of the Lutheran Church.

In the Great Northern War Sweden lost Estonia to Russia, which  governed the land from 1710 to 1918. Imperial Russia granted vast privileges to the resident Baltic-German nobility of Estonia, including freedom to practice their Lutheran faith. During the 18th century, Polish and then Lithuanian Catholic noblemen started to make their own use of this right. The first Catholic mass, after more than a hundred years, was held on 18 January 1786. There were less than 300 Catholics in Estonia at that time. Catholicism began its revival. On 26 December 1845, the new Catholic Church of Tallinn was consecrated, followed by the new Catholic Church of Tartu in 1899.

In 1918, when Estonia gained independence, Estonian citizens had complete freedom of religion. The Holy See recognized Estonia on 10 October 1921.  In 1931 Eduard Profittlich, S.J. became the apostolic administrator for the Catholic Church in Estonia.  In 1936 he was consecrated as the first Estonian Catholic bishop since the Lutheran reformation in the 16th century.  Before World War II broke out, there were almost 5,000 Catholics in Estonia (Tallinn: 2.333, Tartu: 1.073, Narva: ca. 600, Valga: ca. 800).

In 1940 Estonia was invaded by the Soviets and organised religion was prohibited. The majority of the 5000 Catholic faithful either escaped the country or were imprisoned in Soviet prison camps. They arrested Bishop Profittlich who subsequently died in a Soviet prison in Siberia in 1942 after being sentenced to death as a Vatican spy. His cause for canonization as a martyr has been opened.  During the Soviet occupation, all Estonia's Catholic churches were closed and the Catholic population of Estonia decreased below 100 adherents and 1 underground priest who were all heavily persecuted by the KGB.

After the collapse of the Soviet Union, Estonia regained its independence and was re-recognized by the Holy See on 28 August 1991.  Estonia received its first papal visit when Pope John Paul II visited the country in September 1993.

Current state of Catholicism in Estonia
The Catholic population of Estonia is small, but has seen a rapid increase since the end of the Soviet rule. Currently the whole country has approximately 6,000 adherents. Most are of Estonian background but also many Lithuanians and Poles. Most live in the major towns such as Tallinn, Tartu, and Narva. Estonia has no dioceses. Instead, the whole country forms an apostolic administration.  Since 2005, the Apostolic Administrator of Estonia who resides in Tallinn is Bishop Philippe Jean-Charles Jourdan.  Two parishes in Estonia (Tallinn and Tartu) are of the Greek Catholic Church and serve a mostly Ukrainian congregation.

See also
 Estonia–Holy See relations
 Apostolic Administration of Estonia
 Religion in Estonia

References

External links
 Homepage of the Catholic Church in Estonia
 History of the Catholic Church in Estonia
 Estonia and the Vatican
 An article about the history and heyday of the Catholic Church in Estonia in English
 Religion in Estonia: web encyclopedia Estonica
 Apostolic Administration of Estonia

 
Estonia
Estonia